Bridget is an Irish female name derived from the Gaelic noun brígh, meaning "power, strength, vigor, virtue". An alternate meaning of the name is "exalted one". Its popularity, especially in Ireland, is largely related to the popularity of Saint Brigid of Kildare, who was so popular in Ireland she was known as "Mary of the Gael". This saint took on many of the characteristics of the early Celtic goddess Brigid, who was the goddess of agriculture and healing and possibly also of poetry and fire. One of her epithets was "Brigid of the Holy Fire". In German and Scandinavian countries, the popularity of the name spread due to Saint Bridget of Sweden. 

In the Irish language, the name is spelled Brighid or Bríd and is pronounced "breed" or "breej". In the Scottish Gaelic language, the name is spelled Brìghde and is pronounced "breej-eh" At one time the name was so popular for Irish girls that Bridey was used as a slang term for an Irish girl in English-speaking countries. Some Irish servant girls were called Biddie or Biddy by their employers even if that wasn't their real first name. It has been steadily used in the United States throughout the 20th and 21st centuries, though never among the top 100 most popular names for girls. It was most popular in the 1970s, when it ranked as the 153rd most popular name for girls born in that decade in the United States. It was ranked as the 367th most common name for girls and women in the United States in the 1990 census.

People with the name
 Bridget Adams (1928–2019), English figure skater
 Bridget Allchin (1927–2017), English archaeologist
 Bridget Archer (born 1975), Australian politician
 Bridget Armstrong (born 1937), New Zealand actress
 Bridget S. Bade (born 1965), American judge and lawyer
 Bridget Barrett (died 1845), Irish murder victim
 Bridget Becker (born 1981), New Zealand curler
 Bridget Bedard, American producer and television writer
 Bridget Bendish (1650–1726), daughter of Bridget Cromwell
 Bridget Benenate, American songwriter
 Bridget Bevan (1698–1779), Welsh educationalist and public benefactor
 Bridget Bishop (c. 1632–1692), first person executed for witchcraft during the Salem witch trials
 Bridget Boakye, Ghanaian data scientist, entrepreneur and writer
 Bridget Boland (1913–1988), Irish novelist, playwright and screenwriter
 Bridget Breiner (born 1974), American dancer and choreographer
 Bridget M. Brennan (born 1974), American judge and lawyer
 Bridget Brind, British diplomat
 Bridget A. Brink, American diplomat
 Bridget Buckley (born 1955), English rower
 Bridget Burgess (born 2001), Australian stock car racing driver
 Bridget Calitz (born 1997), South African lawn bowler 
 Bridget Callahan (born 1996), American soccer player
 Bridget Carleton (born 1997), Canadian basketball player
 Bridget Carey (born 1984), American technology journalist
 Bridget Carpenter, American playwright and screenwriter
 Bridget Carragher (born 1957), South African physicist
 Bridget Cherry (born 1941), English architectural historian
 Bridget Christie (born 1971), English actress, comedian and writer
 Bridget Cleary (1867–1895), Irish woman murdered by her husband
 Bridget Connolly (1890–1981), Irish nationalist and republican
 Bridget R. Cooks, American academic, curator, scholar and writer
 Bridget Cromwell (1624–1662), eldest daughter of Oliver Cromwell
 Bridget Dirrane (1894–2003), Irish memoirist and nurse
 Bridget Donahue, American art dealer
 Bridget Dowling (1891–1969), sister-in-law of Adolf Hitler
 Bridget Doyle, Irish camogie player
 Bridget Drinka (born 1951), American linguist
 Bridget Durity (born 1951), Trinidadian cricketer
 Bridget Dwyer (born 1980), American golfer
 Bridget Egerton (1577–1648), English religious writer 
 Bridget Everett (born 1972), American comedian
 Bridget Flanery, American actress
 Bridget Flannery (born 1959), Irish painter
 Bridget Fonda (born 1964), American actress
 Bridget Franek (born 1987), American middle distance runner
 Bridget Gainer (born 1968/1969), American politician
 Bridget Galloway (born 1999), English footballer player
 Bridget Gilling (1922–2009), English–Australian activist and feminist
 Bridget Goodwin (c. 1827–1899), Irish–New Zealand goldminer
 Bridget Hall (born 1977), American model
 Bridget Hanley (1941–2021), American actress
 Bridget Haraldsdotter (c. 1131–1208), Queen consort of Sweden
 Bridget Harrison (born 1971), English freelance journalist
 Bridget Hodson, English actress
 Bridget Hoffman (born 1961/1962), American voice actress
 Bridget Holmes (1591–1691), English domestic servant
 Bridget Hustwaite (born 1991), Australian radio presenter and journalist
 Bridget Hutter, English sociologist
 Bridget Hyem (1933–2014), Australian equestrian
 Bridget Ikin, New Zealand film producer
 Bridget Jackson (born 1936), English golfer
 Bridget Jones Nelson (born 1964), American actress and screenwriter
 Bridget Kahele (born 1996), American rugby player 
 Bridget Karlin, American entrepreneur
 Bridget Katsriku, Ghanaian public servant
 Bridget Kearney (born 1985), American musician and songwriter 
 Bridget Anne Kelly (born 1972), American political consultant
 Bridget Kelly (born 1986), American singer and songwriter
 Bridget Kendall (born 1956), English journalist
 Bridget Kumwenda (born 1991), Malawi netball player
 Bridget Terry Long (born 1973), American economics professor
 Bridget Lowe, American poet
 Bridget Maasland (born 1974), Dutch television presenter
 Bridget G. MacCarthy (1904–1993), Irish academic and writer
 Bridget Malcolm, Australian model
 Bridget Markham (1579–1609), English courtier
 Bridget Martyn (1935–2020), Egyptian–born English encyclopedist
 Bridget Masango (born 1962), South African politician 
 Bridget Masinga (born 1981), South African actress, model, radio and television personality
 Bridget Marquardt (born 1973), American television personality
 Bridget McConnell (born 1958), Scottish cultural administrator
 Bridget Mary McCormack (born 1966), American judge, lawyer and professor
 Bridget McDonough, American theatre director
 Bridget McEvilly (born 1946), English nursing administrator
 Bridget McKeever (born 1983), Irish field hockey player
 Bridget McKenzie (born 1969), Australian politician
 Bridget Minamore (born 1991). British poet, essayist, journalist and critic
 Bridget Moran (1923–1999), Canadian activist and author
 Bridget Motha (born 1986), South African soccer player
 Bridget Moynahan (born 1971), American actress and model
 Bridget Mutuma, Kenyan–South African nanotechnologist
 Bridget Namiotka (born 1990), American pair skater
 Bridget Neval (born 1985), Indian–born Australian–Canadian actress
 Bridget Newell (1911–1937), English barrister and golfer
 Bridget Parsons (1907–1972), English socialite
 Bridget Partridge (1890–1966), Irish–born Australian Catholic religious sister
 Bridget Pastoor (born 1940), Canadian politician
 Bridget Patterson (born 1994), Australian cricketer
 Bridget Perrier (born 1977), Canadian anti-prostitution activist
 Bridget Pettis (born 1971), American basketball player and coach
 Bridget Phillipson (born 1983), English politician
 Bridget Pickering, Namibian Film producer
 Bridget Pitt, Zimbabwean–born South African environmental activist and writer
 Bridget Poulett (1912–1975), English socialite 
 Bridget Powers (born 1980), American pornographic actress with dwarfism
 Bridget Prentice, (born 1952), Scottish politician
 Bridget Redmond (1904–1952), Irish politician
 Bridget Regan (born 1982), American actress
 Bridget Reweti, New Zealand photographer and moving image artist
 Bridget Rice (1885–1967), Irish politician
 Bridget Riley (born 1931), English painter
 Bridget Robinson, New Zealand oncology academic
 Bridget Rosewell, (born 1951), English economist
 Bridget Rowe (1950–2021), English newspaper editor
 Bridget Scanlon (born 1959), American hydrogeologist
 Bridget Sequeira (1905–1987), Pakistani religious sister
 Bridget Sloan (born 1992), American artistic gymnast
 Bridget St John (born 1946), English singer and songwriter
 Bridget Stutchbury, Canadian biologist
 Bridget Tan (1948–2022), Singaporean activist
 Bridget Tolley (born 1960), Canadian Algonquin community worker
 Bridget Turner (1939–2014), English actress
 Bridget Vallence, Australian politician
 Bridget Valverde (born 1982), American politician
 Bridget Wade, English micropalaeontologist
 Bridget Walters, Australian actress
 Bridget Williams (born 1948), New Zealand publisher and founder of Bridget Williams Books
 Bridget Wishart (born 1962), English musician, singer and performance artist

Fictional characters
 Bridget (Guilty Gear), in the fighting game series Guilty Gear
 Bridget, in the film The Wild
 Bridget, in the film An American Tail
 Bridget Forrester, in The Bold and the Beautiful
 Bridget Hennessey, the eldest child on the sitcom 8 Simple Rules
 Bridget Jones
 Bridget von Hammersmark, played by Diane Kruger in the film Inglourious Basterds
 Bridget "Bee" Vreeland, in the book and movie The Sisterhood of the Traveling Pants

Variations

Birgit (Estonian), (Norwegian)
Birgitta (Danish), (Finnish), (Icelandic), (Norwegian), (Swedish)
Birgitte (Danish), (Norwegian)
Breeshey (Manx)
Bridget (English)
Bridgette (English)
Bridgid (English)
Brídín (Irish)
Bridzhit (Bulgarian), (Russian)
Bridzhyt (Ukrainian)
Brigette (French)
Brìghde (Scottish Gaelic)
Brighid (Irish)
Brighidín (Irish)
Brigid (Old Irish)
Brígida (Catalan), (Portuguese), (Spanish)
Brigida (Italian), (Spanish)
Brigit (Old Irish)
Brigita (Croatian), (Czech), (Latvian), (Lithuanian), (Slovenian)
Brigitta (Dutch), (German), (Hungarian)
Brigitte (French), (German)
Brita (Finnish)
Britta (Danish), (Norwegian), (Swedish)
Brygida (Polish)
Ffraid (Welsh)
Gitta (German)
Gittan (Swedish)
Gitte (Danish)
Piret (Estonian)
Piritta (Finnish)
Pirjo (Finnish)
Pirkko (Finnish)
Priita (Finnish)
Riitta (Finnish)

See also
Brigid (disambiguation)
List of Irish-language given names

References

Bibliography
Rosenkrantz, Linda, and Satran, Pamela Redmond (2008). Cool Names for Babies. St. Martin's Griffin. 
Todd, Loreto (1998). Celtic Names for Children. Irish American Book Company. .

Irish feminine given names
English feminine given names